Idiosoma nigrum, also called black rugose trapdoor spider, occurs only in south-western Western Australia, in dry woodlands east of the Darling Scarp and north to Moore River.

Females can reach a length of about 30mm, males about 18mm.

Idiosoma nigrum digs burrows up to 32 cm deep.

Name
The species name is derived from Latin Niger "black".

References

External links

 

Idiopidae
Spiders of Australia
Fauna of Western Australia
Spiders described in 1952
Taxa named by Barbara York Main